Thomas Fielden Taylor (1879–1937) was a notable New Zealand Anglican priest and city missioner. He was born in Chelsea, London, England in 1879.

References

1879 births
1937 deaths
People from Chelsea, London
New Zealand Anglican priests
English emigrants to New Zealand